ORP Sęp (ex. HNoMS Skolpen) is a Norwegian Kobben-class submarine, serving in the Polish Navy.

Entered Norwegian service as HNoMS Skolpen in 1966. Decommissioned in 2001 and transferred to Poland in 2002.

References

External links 

 Youtube video footage of the boat

Kobben-class submarines of the Polish Navy